The Indian National Rodeo Finals Hall of Fame is a hall of fame in Browning, Montana, dedicated to the sport of rodeo. The Indian National Finals Rodeo is dedicated to preserving and promoting the sport of Indian rodeo through as many channels as are available to it.

History
The Indian National Rodeo Finals was created in 1976 by five people who took some regional associations to make one larger association. Indian cowboys and cowgirls competed together in the first finals that year in the Salt Palace in Salt Lake City, Utah. The association now claims 11 regions throughout the United States and Canada.

Inductees

2019 Inductees
The inaugural year of inductees took place in 2011.

Eugene Creighton
 Howard Edmundson
 Allen Fisher
 Pam Hall
 Daniel Susan

2018 Inductees
 Wright Bruised Head
 Yvette Vega
 Ed Hall
 Jack Foreman
 Leonard Williams Sr.

2017 Inductees
 Geneve Tsouhlarkis
 Spike Guardipee
 Britt Givens
 Bob (Tonto) Gottfriedson
 Melvin Joseph Kenton Randall

2016 Inductees
 Levi Black Water Sr.
 Ed Holyan
 Julius Y Begay
 Traci Vaile
 Dee Keener

2015 Inductees
 Dave Best
 Sam Bird
 Kelvin Fox
 Carole Jackson-Holyan
 Jerry Small

2014 Inductees
 Gary Not Afraid
 CL Johnson
 Larry Condon
 Archie Becenti
 Lyle Cochran

2013 Inductees
 Jim Jacobs
 Bud Connelly
 Ervin Watson
 Pete Bruised Head
 John Colliflower

2012 Inductees
 Gracie Welsh
 Josiah Johns
 Harry Shade
 Felix C. Gilbert Sr.
 Howard Hunter Sr.

2011 Inaugural Inductees
 Dean C. Jackson
 Fred Gladstone
 Pete Fredericks
 Bob Arrington
 Jay Harwood
 Mel Sampson

See also
Indian rodeo

References

External links
 Official Website

2013 establishments in Montana
Cowboy halls of fame
Sports halls of fame
Sports hall of fame inductees
Halls of fame in Montana
Awards established in 2013
Museums established in 2013
Lists of sports awards